Quarwood or Quar Wood is a Victorian manor near Stow-on-the-Wold, Gloucestershire, England. It was formerly owned by The Who's bassist John Entwistle.

Description
The Rhenish Gothic house is built on a hill in Lower Swell, approached by a long driveway and through an entrance with two stone pillars decorated with lion plinths. The house, which includes a saddle roof and open loggia, has 55 rooms.

The main hallway features a cantilevered staircase with wrought-iron balustrade and oak handrail which leads to a galleried landing. A formal drawing room has an open fireplace with a timber surround. The Cotswold landscape is visible through picture windows, and formal gardens include terraces and a croquet lawn facing south toward the  Dikler river valley. When Entwistle bought the home, he installed two recording studios, one on the main floor and one on the top floor, and a bar with game rooms. Known for a macabre sense of humour, Entwistle kept skeletons in the master bedroom to frighten guests.

The grounds enclose 42 acres, including parkland, fish ponds, paddocks, garages, woodlands and seven cottages.

History

The house was designed by architect John Loughborough Pearson and built in 1856–59 for £8,000 for Reverend Robert William Hippisley, who was the local parish priest (rector) (1844-1899).  The parish's lucrative farming and malting across its  provided a then-record salary for that parish of £525 by 1870. Pearson had previously designed Treberfydd in Brecknockshire for Robert Raikes (1818–1901), Hippisley's brother-in-law and grandson of Robert Raikes, a wealthy Anglican minister who increased junior education during and after the Industrial Revolution through expanding a nationwide charity for Sunday Schools. Pearson had completed restoration work on St Edward's Church.

Quarwood was extensively remodeled in 1954–58 by Sir Denys Lowson. John Entwistle and his wife Alison bought the property as a weekend retreat in 1976, and Entwistle occupied the house until his death in 2002. In 2004 his son Christopher offered the house for sale at a price of £3.75 million. Entwistle's ashes were buried in the grounds. The house is currently owned by Piet Pulford.

See also
List of non-ecclesiastical works by J. L. Pearson

References

External links
Quarwood photo

Country houses in Gloucestershire
Houses completed in 1859
J. L. Pearson buildings
John Entwistle